Interstate 229 (I-229) is the designation for two Interstate Highways in the United States, both related to Interstate 29:
 Interstate 229 (South Dakota), a bypass of Sioux Falls, South Dakota
 Interstate 229 (Missouri),  a loop around St. Joseph, Missouri

29-2
2